Dean Butler may refer to:

Dean Butler (field hockey) (born 1977), member of the Australian Men's Olympic Hockey team
Dean Butler (actor) (born 1956), American movie and television actor